is a Japanese footballer who plays for Matsumoto Yamaga FC, as a centre back.

Career 
Hashiuchi made his senior debut for Sanfrecce Hiroshima on 3 May 2006, at Komaba Stadium against Omiya Ardija.
He replaced Hisato Satō after 75 minutes in a 1–0 victory for Hiroshima.

On 1 February 2010, Ossan joined J.League Division 2 side Tokushima Vortis on loan until January 2011. On 17 December 2010, Ossan signed a permanent deal with Tokushima until the end of the season after having his contract cancelled by Hiroshima.

Career statistics
Updated to 24 February 2020.

References

External links

Profile at Matsumoto Yamaga
Profile at Tokushima Vortis

1987 births
Living people
Association football people from Shiga Prefecture
Japanese footballers
J1 League players
J2 League players
Japan Football League players
Sanfrecce Hiroshima players
Gainare Tottori players
Tokushima Vortis players
Matsumoto Yamaga FC players
Association football defenders